Eesti tippmodell, season 1 was the first installment of the Estonian adaptation of America's Next Top Model founded by Tyra Banks. The judges for season one, were Kaja Wunder, Margit Jõgger, Toomas Volkmann, and Arne Niit.

The winner of the competition was 15-year-old Helina Metsik, from Pärnu. Her prize was a one-year modelling contract with Premier Model Management, and appear on the cover of Estonian Cosmopolitan.

Contestants
(ages are stated at start of contest)

Episode summaries

Episode 1
Casting episode.

Episode 2

First call-out: Xena Vassiljeva	
Bottom two: Anne-Lys Kuldmaa-Pärisalu & Kerli Sabbal	
Eliminated: Kerli Sabbal

Episode 3

First call-out: Keiu Simm	
Bottom two: Anne-Lys Kuldmaa-Pärisalu & Mari Naujokas	
Eliminated: Anne-Lys Kuldmaa-Pärisalu

Episode 4

First call-out: Triinu Lääne	
Bottom two: Aleksandra Cherdakova & Gerli Kai Sosaar	
Eliminated: Aleksandra Cherdakova & Gerli Kai Sosaar

Episode 5

First call-out: Adeline Vaher-Vahter & Ksenia Viksne	
Bottom two: Anita Tumaš & Evelin Orav	
Eliminated: Anita Tumaš

Episode 6

First call-out: Helina Metsik	
Bottom two: Evelin Orav & Triinu Lääne	
Eliminated: Evelin Orav

Episode 7

Eliminated: Mari Naujokas	
First call-out: Lisann Luik	
Bottom two: Adeline Vaher-Vahter	& Xena Vassiljeva	
Eliminated: None

Episode 8

First call-out: None
Bottom two: None
Eliminated: None

Episode 9

First call-out: Helina Metsik	
Bottom two: Ksenia Viksne & Lisann Luik	
Eliminated: Ksenia Viksne

Episode 10

First call-out: Helina Metsik	
Bottom two: Adeline Vaher-Vahter	& Xena Vassiljeva	
Eliminated: Adeline Vaher-Vahter

Episode 11

First call-out: Xena Vassiljeva	
Bottom two: Lisann Luik & Triinu Lääne	
Eliminated: Lisann Luik

Episode 12

First call-out: Xena Vassiljeva	
Bottom two: Helina Metsik & Triinu Lääne	
Eliminated: Triinu Lääne

Episode 13
Recap episode.

Episode 14

Quit: Keiu Simm	
Returned: Triinu Lääne		
Final three: Helina Metsik, Xena Vassiljeva & Triinu Lääne
Second runner-up: Triinu Lääne
Runner-up: Xena Vassiljeva
Estonia's Next Top Model: Helina Metsik

Summaries

Call-out order

 The contestant was eliminated
 The contestant was part of a non elimination bottom-two
 The contestant was eliminated outside of the judging panel
 The contestant was absent at elimination and was safe
 The contestant quit the competition
 The contestant won the competition

 In episode 4, Aleksandra and Gerli Kai landed in the bottom two. Both of them were eliminated from the competition.
 In episode 5, Adeline & Ksenia were collectively called out first.
 In episode 7, Mari was eliminated before the call-out order. Despite the fact that the judges thought Adeline and Xena had the worst pictures, they chose not to eliminate them. Instead, the girls missed out on the trip overseas the following episode as a punishment. 
 In episode 8, there was no photo shoot or elimination. Only the London fashion show took place that week.
 In episode 9, Adeline and Xena did not take part in the call-out. The elimination of the episode was based on the photo shoot that the other five girls had in London. 
 Episode 13 was the recap episode.
 In episode 14, Keiu quit the competition. Due to the number opening, Triinu was brought back.

Photo shoot guide
Episode 2 photo shoot: Lingerie on Balbiino ice cream
Episode 3 photo shoot: Posing with food
Episode 4 photo shoot: Suspended over escalators in gowns
Episode 5 photo shoot: Rock stars in pairs
Episode 6 photo shoot: Brides in couture dresses with musician Tanel Padar
Episode 7 photo shoot: Underwater shoot
Episode 9 photo shoot: Pouring gasoline on a house
Episode 10 photo shoots: Pin-up girls; Kristiine Keskus shopping center campaign
Episode 11 photo shoots: Posing with a car; Cosmopolitan editorial; B&W beauty shots
Episode 12 photo shoot: Tanel Veenre jewelry campaign
Episode 14 motion picture: Passion for fashion

References

External links
 Official Show Website

2012 Estonian television seasons
Eesti tippmodell